Sofia University, "St. Kliment Ohridski" at the University of Sofia, (Sofijski universitet „Sv. Kliment Ohridski“) is the oldest higher education institution in Bulgaria.

Founded on 1 October 1888, the edifice of the university was constructed between 1924 and 1934 with the financial support of the brothers Evlogi Georgiev and Hristo Georgiev (whose sculptures are now featured on its façade) and has an area of 18,624 m2 and a total of 324 premises. The university has 16 faculties and three departments, where over 21,000 students receive their education. The current rector is Anastas Gerdzhikov.

It has been consistently ranked as the top university in Bulgaria according to national and international rankings, being constantly among the best four percent of world universities according to QS World University Rankings.

History 

The university was founded on 1 October 1888—ten years after the liberation of Bulgaria—to serve as Bulgaria's primary institution of higher education. Initially, it had four  regular and three additional lecturers and 49 students. It was founded as a higher pedagogical course, it became a higher school after a few months and a university in 1904. The first rector was Bulgarian linguist Aleksandar Teodorov-Balan.

During Sofia University's first years, it had three faculties, namely a Faculty of History and Philology (since 1888), a Faculty of Mathematics and Physics (since 1889) and a Faculty of Law (since 1892). History, geography, Slavic philology, philosophy and pedagogics, mathematics and physics, chemistry, natural sciences and law were also taught. The first women (16 in number) were welcomed to the university in 1901 and 25 November (8 December N.S.), the day of St. Kliment of Ohrid, became the university's official holiday the following year.

As Prince Ferdinand opened the National Theatre in 1907, he was booed by Sofia University students, for which the university was closed for six months and all lecturers were fired. Not until a new government with Aleksandar Malinov at the head came into power in January 1908 was the crisis resolved.

At the beginning of the Balkan Wars, 1,379 students (725 men and 654 women) were recorded to attend the university. A fourth faculty was established in 1917, the Faculty of Medicine, the fifth, the Faculty of Agronomy following in 1921, the Faculty of Veterinary Medicine and the Faculty of Theology being founded in 1923. In 1922–1923, Sofia University had 111 chairs, 205 lecturers and assistants and 2,388 students, of which 1,702 men and 686 women.

The foundation stone of Sofia University's new edifice was laid on 30 June 1924. Funds were secured by the brothers Evlogi Georgiev and Hristo Georgiev. The rectorate was built according to the initial plans of the French architect Henri Bréançon, who had won a competition for the purpose in 1907. The plans were developed by Nikola Lazarov and revised by Yordan Milanov, who also directed the construction, but died before the official opening on 16 December 1934.

On 27 October 1929, the first doctoral thesis in natural science of the university was defended by geologist Vassil Tzankov. The second one in chemistry followed on 1 July 1930 and the title doctor was granted to Aleksandar Spasov. In 1930–1931, the university had four more doctors.

After the political changes of 9 September 1944 and the emergence of the People's Republic of Bulgaria, radical alterations were made in the university system of the country. At that time in 1944–1945, 13,627 students attended the university, taught by 182 professors and readers and 286 assistants. Communist professors were introduced to the higher ranks of university authority, with others that did not share these views being removed. Specific party-related chairs were established and the university was restricted after the Soviet model. Three new faculties were founded in 1947, one of forestry, one of zootechnics and one of economics and major changes occurred, with many departments seceding in later years to form separate institutions.

In 2001, the Sofia University was the first Bulgarian Athenaeum to open a Theological Faculty ruled by the national Orthodox Church after the fall of communism.

Sofia University Mountains on Alexander Island, Antarctica were named for the university in commemoration of its centennial celebrated in 1988 and in appreciation of the university's contribution to the Antarctic exploration.

Faculties and departments

Faculties 

Sofia University offers a wide range of degrees in 16 faculties:
 Faculty of Biology
 Faculty of Chemistry and Pharmacy
 Faculty of Classical and Modern Philology
 Faculty of Economics and Business Administration
 Faculty of Education
 Faculty of Geology and Geography
 Faculty of History
 Faculty of Journalism and Mass Communication
 Faculty of Law
 Faculty of Mathematics and Informatics
 Faculty of Philosophy
 Faculty of Physics https://www.phys.uni-sofia.bg
 Faculty of Pre-school and Primary School Education
 Faculty of Slavic Studies
 Faculty of Theology
 Faculty of Medicine

Departments 
 Department of Language Learning
 Department for Information and In-service Training of Teachers
 Sports Department

Affiliated bodies 
 Balkan Universities Network
 National Centre of Polar Research

Notable alumni 

  Elisaveta Bagryana, poet
  Anthony Bailey, businessman
  Pepka Boyadjieva, sociologist
  Kiril Bratanov, scientist
  Iván Cepeda, politician and senator of Colombia
  Ljubomir Chakaloff, mathematician
 / Boris Christoff, opera singer
  Raymond Detrez, historian
  Philip Dimitrov, politician and lawyer, former Prime Minister of Bulgaria and member of the Constitutional Court of Bulgaria
  Todor Georgiev, scientist and inventor
  Khristo Ivanov, scientist
  Rostislaw Kaischew, scientist
  Ivan Kostov, politician and economist, former Prime Minister of Bulgaria
 / Julia Kristeva, philosopher and writer
  Maxim, cleric and head of the Bulgarian Orthodox Church
  Georgi Nadjakov, physicist
  Ivan Kostov Nikolov, geologist and mineralogist
  Ya'akov Nitzani, politician, Knesset member
  Georgi Parvanov, former President of Bulgaria
 / Ivan Georgiev Petrov, physicist
  Assen Razcvetnikov, poet, writer and translator
  Dimitar Sasselov, astronomer
  Lachezara Stoeva, diplomat
  Petar Stoyanov, former president of Bulgaria
 / Ivan Stranski, physical chemist
 / Tzvetan Todorov, philosopher
  Orlin D. Velev, professor and scientist
  Mikhail Wehbe, diplomat
  Zhelyu Zhelev, former President of Bulgaria
  Maria Zheleva, filmmaker and former First Lady of Bulgaria
  Lyudmila Zhivkova, politician

Faculty 
 Snejina Gogova, sinologist, sociolinguist and psycholinguist, Professor of Chinese linguistics

Partner Universities

Europe
Humboldt-Universität Berlin, Technische Universität Dresden, Université de Genéve, Université libre de Bruxelles and others.

See also 
 List of modern universities in Europe (1801–1945)

Notes and references

External links 

 Sofia University website 
 
 Efficiency and public funding for higher education in Bulgaria

 
Buildings and structures in Sofia
Educational institutions established in 1888
1888 establishments in Bulgaria
Universities established in the 19th century